Nathusius Investments Sp.z o.o. is a media investment company with a focus on diversified b2b publishing and event activities based in Warsaw, Poland.

History 
The company was founded in 1994 and originally focussed on publishing licensed special interest magazines. Major titles have been “Moje Mieszkanie” (an interior magazine based on a license by German publisher Gruner + Jahr), “Majster” (a do it yourself-title licensed from German Jahreszeiten Verlag) and the knitting magazine “Sandra” (by DPV/BPV). In 1999 all consumer titles were sold, partly to local subsidiaries of the licensors, partly to other publishers like Motorpresse Polska (publisher of the Polish version of “Auto, Motor und Sport”).

In 1996 Nathusius Investments started business-to-business publishing with the foundation of the subsidiary Unit Wydawnictwo Informacje Branżowe. This entity published 15 magazines, mainly directed to trade managers in the non-fast-moving consumer goods-sector. The company was sold in the year 2000 to Verlagsgruppe Ebner Ulm (publisher of “WatchTime Magazine”).

Beside publishing business magazines Nathusius Investments in 1998 involved in several internet-only businesses through its subsidiary WebMastersHome Sp. z o.o.. Public attention has been raised by the project “Salon.pl” (run by Shop Online Sp.z o.o., a company owned by WebMastersHome).

Activities today 
With the brand “Disco Magic Publishing” Nathusius Investments since 1995 is a representative of foreign record labels and as member of the Polish copyright collection society Stowarzyszenie Autorów ZAiKS (Związek Autorów i Kompozytorów Scenicznych) listed with more than 4.000 songs actually.

Nathusius Investments established several awards, for example the Polish dairy industry award “Lider Forum”. Others are “Top Kupiec” and “Top Sprzedawca”. The company is a member in the Polish Press Publishers Association (Izba Wydawców Prasy - IWP), the International Advertising Association, Polish chapter and at the Polish press auditing association ZKDP (Związek Kontroli Dystrybucji Prasy).

Major brands 
 Disco Magic Publishing
 Forum Mleczarskie - Media Branży Nabiałowej
 Strategie - Świat Dyrektorów Finansowych

References

External links 
 Website of the company
 Website of the award Lider Forum

Publishing companies of Poland
Publishing companies established in 1994
Mass media in Warsaw